

Squad

First-team squad
As of 1 September 2008.

Youth squad

Transfers

In

Out

Out on loan

Appearances and goals
Last updated on 1 November 2008.

|}
1= Player's number was given to another player after the player left the club.

Pre-season

Allsvenskan

Svenska Cupen

References

External links
 Halmstads BK homepage
 SvFF homepage

2008
Halmstad